Upper Weald, Middle Weald and Lower Weald are three hamlets in the parish of Calverton (where the 2011 Census populations were added) in the City of Milton Keynes, England. They are located to the south east of the village centre, all three on the road to Whaddon.

References

Hamlets in Buckinghamshire
Areas of Milton Keynes